"Fun" is a song by American rapper Pitbull, featuring American singer Chris Brown. The song was released on February 21, 2015 as the fourth single off of Pitbull's eighth studio album Globalization. The song peaked at number 40 on the Billboard Hot 100.

Music video
A colourful music video inspired with the influences from Miami Vice and GTA Vice City was released on June 19, 2015. It features Pitbull and Brown. It was directed by Gil Green. Nuestra Belleza Latina 2013 winner Marisela de Montecristo made a cameo appearance in the video.

HollywoodLife'''s Christopher Rogers called the video "amazing" and "masterpiece", and also added that it has everything the audience would want in a music video released in the summer. Zach Frydenlund of Complex gave a negative review, saying the video "doesn't actually look fun at all".

 Live performances 
Pitbull and Chris Brown performed the song on the finale of the singing competition series American Idol on May 13, 2015. That season's American Idol eighth-place finisher Qaasim Middleton also joined them on the stage for the final verse.

On May 17, Pitbull and Brown performed "Fun" at the 2015 Billboard Music Awards.

On May 20, Pitbull performed "Fun" and "Time of Our Lives" on The Tonight Show Starring Jimmy Fallon''.

Chart performance
The single debuted at number 77 on the US Billboard Hot 100 chart, on the week of May 30, 2015. After climbing the chart for six more weeks, the single reached its peak at number 40 on the chart.

Charts

Weekly charts

Year-end charts

Certifications

Release history

References 

2014 songs
2015 singles
Pitbull (rapper) songs
Chris Brown songs
Songs written by Chris Brown
Songs written by Jason Evigan
Songs written by Pitbull (rapper)
Songs written by Clarence Coffee Jr.
Song recordings produced by the Monsters & Strangerz
Songs written by Jordan Johnson (songwriter)
Songs written by Eskeerdo
Songs written by Marcus Lomax
Songs written by Stefan Johnson
Song recordings produced by Jason Evigan